Gregg Champion (born November 20, 1956, in Los Angeles, California) is an American film director, known for his work on wide release and TV Hollywood movies. His parents are Marge Champion and Gower Champion.

Work in Film & Television

After attending the USC School of Cinema, Gregg Champion apprenticed with several directors including Blake Edwards, Nicholas Roeg, and John Badham, with whom he shared an eight-year association. Champion's feature producing credits include "Blue Thunder"(Columbia) "Short Circuit"(Tri-Star) and "Stakeout"(20th Century Studios). Champion also served as the Action-Director on those films as well as the Warner Bros. bicycle racing movie "American Flyers" starring Kevin Costner.
 
Champion's feature directing credits include the fish out of water action-comedy "The Cowboy Way" starring Woody Harrelson and Kiefer Sutherland (Universal), and the action-comedy "Short Time" starring Dabney Coleman and Teri Garr (Fox). Television Producing and Directing credits include the award-winning and Emmy-nominated "The Simple Life of Noah Dearborn" starring Sidney Poitier, Dianne Wiest and Mary-Louise Parker as well as CBS Special Movie Presentations "Dodson's Journey" with Ellen Burstyn and Penelope Ann Miller and "The Last Brickmaker in America" again starring Sidney Poitier. Television Series include multiples of "The Magnificent Seven" for CBS/MGM and "Walker Texas Ranger" with Chuck Norris also for CBS. Other long-form movies Champion directed are the Emmy nominated drama "Miracle Run" starring Mary-Louise Parker, Aidan Quinn and Zac Efron, "Stealing Christmas" a romantic comedy starring Tony Danza, Lea Thompson, and Betty White for the USA Network, and the action-drama "14 Hours" for TNT for which Champion received the Christopher Award for best director. Champion received his second Christopher Award for directing "Amish Grace" starring Kimberly Williams-Paisley and Tammy Blanchard which became Lifetime Movie Network's highest rated original movie ever.
 
Most recently, Champion choreographed some bullet-ridden action sequences with Emile Hirsch in the A&E 4hr. mini-series "Bonnie & Clyde" in which he served as the 2nd Unit Director and was Director of the gymnastics bio-pic "The Gabby Douglas Story"...a 2hr. Special Event Movie for Sony and Lifetime that was nominated for 4 NAACP Awards including best director as well as winning the 2015 Christopher Award for best movie.

Filmography
Whose Life Is It Anyway? (1981, producer)
Blue Thunder (1983, producer)
American Flyers (1985, producer)
Short Circuit (1986, producer)
Stakeout (1987, producer)
Short Time (1990, director)
The Cowboy Way (1994, director)
"A Woman's Place" (Walker, Texas Ranger) (1997, director)
The Simple Life of Noah Dearborn (1999, producer and director)
The Magnificent Seven (1999-2000, director, 5 episodes)
Dodson's Journey (2001, producer and director)
The Last Brickmaker in America (2001, producer and director)
Stealing Christmas (2003, producer and director)
Miracle Run (2004, director)
14 Hours (2005, director)
Amish Grace (2010, director)
Field of Vision (2011, director)
The Gabby Douglas Story (2014, director)

References

Living people
1956 births
American film directors
American people of Jewish descent